The women's 4 × 100 metres relay event at the 1952 Summer Olympics took place on July 27.  The United States team  won the final.

Results
The first round and the final were held on the same day. On the first round, the two fastest teams from each heat qualified for the final.

Heats
Heat 1

Heat 2

Heat 3

Final

References

External links
Official Olympic Report, la84.org.

Athletics at the 1952 Summer Olympics
Relay foot races at the Olympics
4 × 100 metres relay
1952 in women's athletics
Women's events at the 1952 Summer Olympics